Buckley may refer to:

Businesses and organizations 
 Buckley's, a Canadian pharmaceutical corporation
 Buckley Aircraft, an American aircraft manufacturer 
 Buckley Broadcasting, an American broadcasting company
 Buckley School (California), U.S.
 Buckley School (New York City), U.S.
 Buckley Country Day School, Roslyn, New York, U.S.

Fictional characters 
 Buckley (The Royal Tenenbaums), a fictional dog
 Buckley, from King of the Hill
 Robin Buckley, from Stranger Things

Places

Antarctica 
 Buckley Bay (Antarctica)

Australia 
 Buckley, Victoria
 Buckley River Important Bird Area, Queensland

Canada 
 Buckley Bay, British Columbia, Canada
 Buckley Bay station

Ireland 
 Buckley Park, a stadium in Kilkenny

United Kingdom 
 Buckley, Greater Manchester, England
 Buckley, Flintshire, Wales
 Buckley Barracks, a military barracks in Wiltshire, England

United States 
 Buckley, Illinois
 Buckley, Michigan
 Buckley Creek, a river in Nebraska
 Buckley, Washington
 Buckley Island, an island on the Ohio River in West Virginia
 Buckley Space Force Base, a military base in Aurora, Colorado

People 
 Buckley Belanger (born 1960), Canadian politician in Saskatchewan
 Buckley Machin (1901–1963), Australian politician
 Buckley Roderick (1862–1908), Welsh solicitor and international rugby union forward
 Buckley (surname), a surname, including a list of people with the name
 Buckley baronets, extinct title in the baronetage of the United Kingdom

Ships 

 USS Buckley (DE-51), a United States Navy destroyer escort in commission from 1943 to 1946
 Buckley-class destroyer escort

See also 
 Buck (disambiguation)
 Buckley & Nunn, a store in Melbourne, Victoria, Australia 
 Buckley & Taylor, a British engineering company
 Senator Buckley (disambiguation)
 USS Dennis J. Buckley, a list of United States Navy ships
 USS Buckley, a list of two ships